Tawanna Phyllis Gaines (February 1, 1952 – November 12, 2022) was an American politician who represented District 22 in the Maryland House of Delegates from December 2001 to October 2019. She resigned in the face of federal corruption charges and was sentenced to six months in prison.

Background
Gaines was born in Washington, DC, on February 1, 1952. She attended District of Columbia Teachers College, 1970-72.

In the legislature
Gaines had been a member of House of Delegates since December 21, 2001 when she was appointed by Governor Parris Glendening to fill the vacancy of Richard Palumbo who himself been appointed judge to the District Court of Maryland for Prince George's County. She was appointed by the Speaker to be Deputy Majority Whip in 2003. She served on the House Appropriations Committee and is the Chairwoman of the Appropriations Sub Committee on Transportation and the Environment, in addition to the capital budget subcommittees. She was also a member of the Legislative Black Caucus of Maryland.

Gaines resigned from the legislature on October 4, 2019 and on October 7 was charged with federal wire fraud for using over $22,000 of campaign money for personal use. Her daughter and campaign treasurer subsequently pled guilty in November 2019 to wire fraud, admitting using campaign funds for personal use. On January 3, 2020, Gaines was sentenced to six months in prison for one count of wire fraud.

Legislative notes
voted for the Clean Indoor Air Act of 2007 (HB359)
voted against slots in 2005 (HB1361)
voted for the Tax Reform Act of 2007(HB2)

Death
Gaines died from bladder cancer on November 12, 2022, at the age of 70.

References

External links
 

1952 births
2022 deaths
Democratic Party members of the Maryland House of Delegates
African-American state legislators in Maryland
African-American women in politics
People from Washington, D.C.
Women state legislators in Maryland
People from Berwyn Heights, Maryland
Berwyn Heights, Maryland
21st-century American women politicians
21st-century American politicians
University of the District of Columbia alumni
Maryland politicians convicted of crimes
21st-century African-American women
21st-century African-American politicians
20th-century African-American people
20th-century African-American women
Maryland city council members
African-American city council members in Maryland
Women city councillors in Maryland